The Rowing Competition at the 1997 Mediterranean Games was held in Bari, Italy.

Medalists

Medal table

References
1997 Mediterranean Games report at the International Committee of Mediterranean Games (CIJM) website

M
Sports at the 1997 Mediterranean Games
 
Rowing competitions in Italy